The Deceived Ones, or The Deceived, is a 1531 comedy of intrigue written collectively by the Accademia degli Intronati (the center of intellectual life in Siena). It was the Academy's first publicly hosted event, performed on the last day of carnival 1532 (February 12).

It uses stock characters of Commedia dell'Arte. It was internationally successful and translated in many languages, including French, Spanish and Latin.

The play is believed to be the main source for the plot of William Shakespeare's comedy Twelfth Night, although as no contemporary English translation of the work is known, his direct source for the influence is uncertain.

References

Italian plays
Comedy plays
1530s plays
History of Siena
Twelfth Night
Renaissance plays